The Coon Creek Science Center is a science center and fossil finding site at 2985 Hardin Graveyard Road in Adamsville, McNairy County, Tennessee, USA.

The science center is situated on a  property on one of the most important fossil sites in North America. The Coon Creek Formation is a geologic formation located in western Tennessee and extreme northeast Mississippi. It is a sedimentary sandy marl deposit, Late Cretaceous in age, about 73 million years old. In the Late Cretaceous epoch, the Gulf of Mexico reached further north and West Tennessee was covered by water. The fossilization began when the water receded. Finds at the Coon Creek site range from marine shells, crabs and snails to vertebrate

See also
 List of museums in Tennessee

References

External links
 

Museums in McNairy County, Tennessee
Natural history museums in Tennessee
Protected areas of McNairy County, Tennessee
Education in McNairy County, Tennessee